TimeTiger is a time and project tracking app developed by Indigo Technologies Ltd. in Toronto, Ontario, Canada. Indigo was founded in 1997 and initially released TimeTiger in 1998.

Company 

The company was incorporated in 1997 and began operations as a custom software developer. TimeTiger (internally called TaskMaster) was developed as a tool to help with Indigo's own project planning and estimating. After releasing TimeTiger as a commercial product in 1998, Indigo shifted its focus to time and project management solutions. TimeTiger first introduced support for web-based time logging in 2000, to appeal to workers who were not already tracking their time for billing reasons. Subsequent development emphasized project analysis tools.

Features 

 Web-based electronic time log
 "To Do" list to monitor project and non-project activities
 Pivot table report designer
 Role-based access control

Software integration 

Reports can be exported to Microsoft Excel or saved as Excel-compatible HTML files. Microsoft Project files can be imported and exported. A Software Development Kit is available.

See also 
Comparison of time tracking software
Productivity

References

External links 

Time-tracking software
Web applications
Proprietary software